Ethan Twomey (born 14 September 2002) is an Irish hurler who plays for Cork Senior Championship club St Finbarr's. He has also joined the Cork senior hurling team in advance of the 2022 season.

Career
Twomey first came to sporting prominence as a schoolboy with Presentation Brothers College. A family connection resulted in his club career beginning with Kilshannig in North Cork; however, he later lined out as a dual player with St Finbarr's. Twomey captained the St Finbarr's minor hurling team to win the Premier Minor Hurling Championship in 2020, defeating Sarsfields in the decider. He was part of the extended panel that won the Premier SFC title in 2021, before winning a Premier SHC title in 2022.

By this stage Twomey had made an impression at inter-county level as a member of the Cork minor hurling team during the 2018 Munster Minor Hurling Championship and 2019 Munster Minor Championship. He later won consecutive All-Ireland Under-20 Championship titles with the under-20 team. Twomey's performances in this grade earned a call-up to the senior team training panel in December 2021.

Career statistics

Honours

St. Finbarr's
Cork Premier Senior Hurling Championship: 2022
Cork Premier Senior Football Championship: 2021
Cork Premier Minor Hurling Championship: 2020

Cork
All-Ireland Under-20 Hurling Championship: 2020, 2021
Munster Under-20 Hurling Championship: 2020, 2021

References

2002 births
Living people
Kilshannig Gaelic footballers
St Finbarr's Gaelic footballers
St Finbarr's hurlers
Cork inter-county hurlers
Dual players